Shiloh Baptist Church is a historic church at 5500 Scovill Avenue in Cleveland, Ohio. The building was originally used as a synagogue and was known as Temple B'nai Jeshurun.

It was built in 1906 and added to the National Register of Historic Places in 1982.

References

External links

 Official website

Central, Cleveland
Baptist churches in Ohio
Churches in Cleveland
Churches on the National Register of Historic Places in Ohio
Neoclassical architecture in Ohio
Churches completed in 1906
20th-century Baptist churches in the United States
Synagogues in Ohio
Jews and Judaism in Cleveland
National Register of Historic Places in Cleveland, Ohio
Neoclassical architecture in Cleveland
1906 establishments in Ohio
Neoclassical church buildings in the United States